Belspring is a census-designated place (CDP) in Pulaski County, Virginia, United States, located at an elevation of  above sea level.  It has the ZIP Code 24058 and the area code 540.  The population of the CDP was 256 at the 2010 Census.

The John Hoge House was added to the National Register of Historic Places in 1988.

References 

Census-designated places in Pulaski County, Virginia